Hitis is a small archipelago and a former municipality in Finland. It lies south from Kimitoön in the province of Southwest Finland.

The main islands of Hitis are Rosala and Hitis. They are connected to the mainland by a ferry. Totally there are over 2 000 islands and islets in Hitis, and some of them are still inhabited permanently. There are many summer cottages in Hitis.

Hitis was a trade harbour during the Viking era. Administratively it was part of Kimito until the municipality was established in 1861. During the World War II there were battles of Bengtskär and Morgonlandet in the area of Hitis. The municipality was merged to Dragsfjärd in 1969.

Villages
Bergö, Biskopsö, Bolax, Böle, Hitis, Holma, Högsåra, Kaxskäla, Kasnäs, Rosala, Stubbnäs, Tunhamn, Vänoxa, Vänö

References

Kimitoön
Former municipalities of Finland
1861 establishments in Finland